Ivo Perišin (4 July 1925 – 30 October 2008) was a Croatian economist, politician and academician. He held various senior governmental posts in the Socialist Republic of Croatia in the 1970s and was mayor of Split, Croatia from 1965 to 1967.

In 1949, Perišin graduated from the University of Zagreb Faculty of Economics. He continued studies at the University of Belgrade, and defended his doctoral thesis at the Belgrade Faculty of Economics in 1959.

From 1956 he was a professor of economics at the University of Zagreb. From 1965 to 1967 he was the Mayor of Split. He served as the governor of the National Bank of Yugoslavia from 1 November 1969 to 31 December 1971. He was President of the Assembly of SR Croatia from 1974 to 1978.

He was admitted as full member of the Yugoslav Academy of Sciences and Arts (today Croatian Academy of Sciences and Arts) on 17 May 1990.

References

|-

1925 births
2008 deaths
People from Kaštela
Presidents of the Parliament of the Socialist Republic of Croatia
Presidents of the Executive Council of the Socialist Republic of Croatia
20th-century Croatian economists
Governors of the National Bank of Yugoslavia
Mayors of Split, Croatia
Members of the Croatian Academy of Sciences and Arts
Academic staff of the University of Zagreb
University of Belgrade Faculty of Economics alumni
Faculty of Economics and Business, University of Zagreb alumni
League of Communists of Croatia politicians
Central Committee of the League of Communists of Yugoslavia members
Burials at Mirogoj Cemetery